The 2015–16 season was Crystal Palace's third consecutive season in the Premier League and their 110th year in existence. The club participated in the Premier League, FA Cup and League Cup. They finished 15th in the Premier League and were runners-up in the FA Cup for the second time in their history. The season covers the period from 1 July 2015 to 30 June 2016.

Competitions

Overview

Goalscorers

Disciplinary record

References

Crystal Palace
Crystal Palace F.C. seasons